Jessie Thomas Reid (born June 1, 1962) is a former professional baseball player who played from 1987–1988 for the San Francisco Giants.

Sources

External links
, or Retrosheet, or Baseball Reference (Minor, Mexican and Japanese Leagues), or Italian Baseball, or Pelota Binaria (Venezuelan Winter League)

1962 births
Living people
African-American baseball players
Algodoneros de Unión Laguna players
American expatriate baseball players in Japan
American expatriate baseball players in Mexico
Baseball players from Honolulu
Cardenales de Lara players
American expatriate baseball players in Venezuela
Diablos Rojos del México players
American expatriate baseball players in Italy
Fresno Giants players
Great Falls Giants players
Kintetsu Buffaloes players
Major League Baseball outfielders
Nettuno Baseball Club players
Nippon Professional Baseball outfielders
Phoenix Firebirds players
San Francisco Giants players
Shreveport Captains players
Tacoma Tigers players
21st-century African-American people
20th-century African-American sportspeople